The 56th Legislature of National Congress was a meeting of the legislative branch of the Federal Government of Brazil, composed by the Federal Senate and the Chamber of Deputies. It convened in Brasília on 1 February 2019, a month after the beginning of Jair Bolsonaro's only term as president, and ended on 31 January 2023.

In the 2018 elections, the Workers' Party won the majority of the Chamber with 56 deputies. The Brazilian Democratic Movement kept the majority in the Senate with 12 senators.

Major events
 1 February 2019: Rodrigo Maia elect president for a third term as leader of the Chamber.
 2 February 2019: Davi Alcolumbre elect president for his first term as leader of the Senate.
 4 February 2019: Joint session of the National Congress to officially inaugurate the 56th Legislature.
 10 July 2019: The Chamber of Deputies approves PEC 6/2019 (Social Security Reform).
 25 September 2019: Public hearing of sub-prosecutor Augusto Aras for Prosecutor General of the Republic in the Constitution and Justice Committee of the Federal Senate. His appointment was approved by the floor of the Senate on the same day.
 22 October 2019: Senate floor approves PEC 6/2019 (Social Security Reform).
 4 December 2019: Chamber floor approves a substitutive project for Minister of Justice and Public Security Sérgio Moro law project "anti-crime".
 3 February 2020: National Congress opens 2nd session of the 56th Legislature with a letter from President Bolsonaro read by Chief of Staff Onyx Lorenzoni.
 18 March 2020: Chamber of Deputies approves the declaration of public calamity sent by president Jair Bolsonaro due to the COVID-19 pandemic in Brazil.
 20 March 2020: Senate approves the declaration of public calamity in its first virtual session presided by senator Antônio Anastasia (PSDB-MG).
 21 October 2020: Senate approves the appointment of Nunes Marques for the Supreme Federal Court.
 1 February 2021: Election for the Director's Board of the Chamber of Deputies and the Federal Senate, with Deputy Arthur Lira (PP-AL) elect leader of the lower house and Senator Rodrigo Pacheco (DEM-MG) elect leader of the upper house.
 3 February 2021: National Congress opens 3rd session of the 56th Legislature with a letter from President Bolsonaro.
 13 April 2021: Senate President Rodrigo Pacheco (DEM-MG) accepts a request of Senator Randolfe Rodrigues (REDE-AP) and other senators for the creation of an Inquiry Parliamentary Committee to investigate the acts of the federal government in the COVID-19 pandemic.
 20 August 2021: The Senate receives an impeachment request against Supreme Court Justice Alexandre de Moraes filed by President Jair Bolsonaro.
 24 August 2021: Public hearing of Augusto Aras for a second term as Prosecutor General of the Republic in the Constitution and Justice Committee of the Federal Senate. His appointment was approved by the floor of the Senate on the same day.
 25 August 2021: Senate President Rodrigo Pacheco rejects and archive the impeachment request against Justice Alexandre de Moraes.
 26 October 2021: COVID-19 CPI in the Senate conclude its works with the approval of the report in a voting of 7-4, recommending criminal charges against 2 companies and 78 individuals, including President Jair Bolsonaro.
 1 December 2021: Senate approves the appointment of André Mendonça for the Supreme Federal Court.
 2 February 2022: National Congress opens 4th and last session of the 56th Legislature with speeches of President Bolsonaro, Chamber President Arthur Lira and Senate and Congress President Rodrigo Pacheco.
 7 December 2022: The Senate approves PEC 32/2022 (Transition Act), to guarantee extra R$ 145 billion (US$ 27.38 billion) for the 2023 budget plan as requested by the transition team of President-elect Luiz Inácio Lula da Silva.
 8 January 2023: The Congress, the Planalto Palace and the Supreme Federal Court are stormed by former president Bolsonaro supporters. Justice Minister Flávio Dino reports at least 1,500 were arrested.
 10 January 2023: The Congress approves the federal intervation in the Federal District.

Party summary

Leadership

Federal Senate

 President of the Federal Senate: Davi Alcolumbre (DEM–AP), until 1 February 2021
 Rodrigo Pacheco (PSD–MG), from 1 February 2021

Government Bloc Leadership
 Government Leader: Carlos Portinho (PL-RJ)
 Majority Leader: Renan Calheiros (MDB-AL)
 MDB Leader: Eduardo Braga (AM)
 PSD Leader: Nelson Trad (MS)
 PL Leader: Flávio Bolsonaro (RJ)
 PODE Leader: Alvaro Dias (PR)
 PP Leader: Mailza Gomes (AC)
 UNIÃO Leader: Davi Alcolumbre (AP)
 PTB Leader: Roberto Rocha (MA)
 Republicanos Leader: Mecias de Jesus (RR)
 PSC Leader: Luiz Carlos do Carmo (GO)

Opposition Bloc Leadership
 Opposition Leader: Randolfe Rodrigues (REDE-AP)
 Minority Leader: Jean-Paul Prates (PT-RN)
 PT Leader: Paulo Rocha (PA)
 PSDB Leader: Izalci Lucas (DF)
 PDT Leader: Cid Gomes (CE)
 PROS Leader: Telmário Mota (RR)
 PSB Leader: Dário Berger (SC)
 Cidadania Leader: Eliziane Gama (MA)
 REDE Leader: Randolfe Rodrigues (AP)

Chamber of Deputies

 President of the Chamber of Deputies: Rodrigo Maia (DEM), until 1 February 2021
 Arthur Lira (PP), from 1 February 2021

Government Bloc Leadership
 Government Leader: Ricardo Barros (PP-PR)
 Majority Leader: Diego Andrade (PSD-MG)
 PL Leader: Altineu Côrtes (RJ)
 PP Leader: André Fufuca (MA)
 UNIÃO Leader: Elmar Nascimento (BA)
 PSD Leader: Antonio Brito (BA)
 Republicanos Leader: Vinicius Carvalho (SP)
 MDB Leader: Isnaldo Bulhões Jr. (AL)
 PSC Leader: Euclydes Pettersen (MG)
 PODE Leader: Igor Timo (MG)
 Avante Leader: Sebastião Oliveira (PE)
 Patriota Leader: Fred Costa (MG)
 PROS Leader: Aline Sleutjes (PR)
 PTB Leader: Paulo Bengtson (PA)

Opposition Bloc Leadership
 Opposition Leader: Wolney Queiroz (PDT-RJ)
 Minority Leader: Alencar Santana (PT-SP)
 PT Leader: Reginaldo Lopes (MG)
 PSB Leader: Ubirajará do Pindaré (MA)
 PSDB Leader: Adolfo Viana (BA)
 PDT Leader: André Figueiredo (CE)
 NOVO Leader: Tiago Mitraud (MG)
 PCdoB Leader: Renildo Calheiros (PE)
 PSOL Leader: Sâmia Bomfim (SP)
 Solidariedade Leader: Lucas Vergilio (GO)
 CIDADANIA Leader: Alex Manente (SP)
 PV Leader: João Carlos Bacelar (BA)
 REDE Representative: Joênia Wapixana (RR)

Members

Federal Senate

Acre
 Eduardo Velloso (UNIÃO)
 Mailza Gomes (PP)
 Sérgio Petecão (PSD)

Alagoas
 Eudócia Caldas (PSB)
 Fernando Collor (PTB)
 Rafael Tenório (MDB)

Amapá
 Davi Alcolumbre (UNIÃO)
 Lucas Barreto (PSD)
 Randolfe Rodrigues (REDE)

Amazonas
 Eduardo Braga (MDB)
 Omar Aziz (PSD)
 Plínio Valério (PSDB)

Bahia
 Angelo Coronel (PSD)
 Jaques Wagner (PT)
 Otto Alencar (PSD)

Ceará
 Cid Gomes (PDT)
 Eduardo Girão (PODE)
 Tasso Jereissati (PSDB)

Espírito Santo
 Fabiano Contarato (PT)
 Marcos do Val (PODE)
 Rose de Freitas (MDB)

Federal District
 Izalci Lucas (PSDB)
 José Reguffe (UNIÃO)
 Leila Barros (PDT)

Goiás
 Jorge Kajuru (PODE)
 Luiz do Carmo (PSC)
 Vanderlan Cardoso (PSD)

Maranhão
 Eliziane Gama (Cidadania)
 Roberto Rocha (PTB)
 Weverton Rocha (PDT)

Mato Grosso
 Fabio Garcia (UNIÃO)
 Margareth Buzetti (PP)
 Wellington Fagundes (PL)

Mato Grosso do Sul
 Nelsinho Trad (PSD)
 Simone Tebet (MDB)
 Soraya Thronicke (UNIÃO)

Minas Gerais
 Alexandre Silveira (PSD)
 Carlos Viana (PL)
 Rodrigo Pacheco (PSD)

Pará
 Jader Barbalho (MDB)
 Paulo Rocha (PT)
 Zequinha Marinho (PL)

Paraíba
 Daniella Ribeiro (PP)
 Nilda Gondim (MDB)
 Veneziano Vital do Rêgo (MDB)

Paraná
 Alvaro Dias (PODE)
 Flávio Arns (PODE)
 Oriovisto Guimarães (PODE)

Pernambuco
 Fernando Bezerra Coelho (MDB)
 Humberto Costa (PT)
 Jarbas Vasconcelos (MDB)

Piauí
 Ciro Nogueira (PP)
 Elmano Férrer (PP)
 Marcelo Castro (MDB)

Rio de Janeiro
 Carlos Portinho (PL)
 Flávio Bolsonaro (PL)
 Romário (PL)

Rio Grande do Norte
 Jean-Paul Prates (PT)
 Styvenson Valentim (PODE)
 Zenaide Maia (PROS)

Rio Grande do Sul
 Lasier Martins (PODE)
 Luis Carlos Heinze (PP)
 Paulo Paim (PT)

Rondônia
 Acir Gurgacz (PDT)
 Confúcio Moura (MDB)
 Marcos Rogério (PL)

Roraima
 Chico Rodrigues (UNIÃO)
 Mecias de Jesus (Republicanos)
 Telmário Mota (PROS)

Santa Catarina
 Dário Berger (PSB)
 Esperidião Amin (PP)
 Jorginho Mello (PL)

São Paulo
 Alexandre Giordano (MDB)
 José Serra (PSDB)
 Mara Gabrilli (PSDB)

Sergipe
 Alessandro Vieira (PSDB)
 Maria do Carmo Alves (PP)
 Rogério Carvalho (PT)

Tocantins
 Eduardo Gomes (PL)
 Irajá Abreu (PSD)
 Kátia Abreu (PP)

Chamber of Deputies

Acre
 Mara Rocha (PSDB)
 Jéssica Sales (MDB)
 Alan Rick (DEM)
 Vanda Milani (SOLIDARIEDADE)
 Flaviano Melo (MDB)
 Perpétua Almeida (PCdoB)
 Jesus Sérgio (PDT)
 Manuel Marcos (REPUBLICANOS)

Alagoas
 João Henrique Caldas (PSB)
 Arthur Lira (PP)
 Marx Beltrão (PSD)
 Sérgio Toledo (PR)
 Nivaldo Albuquerque (PTB)
 Isnaldo Bulhões (MDB)
 Severino Pessôa (REPUBLICANOS)
 Paulão (PT)
 Tereza Nelma (PSDB)

Amapá
 Camilo Capiberibe (PSB)
 Acácio Favacho (PROS)
 Vinicius Gurgel (PR)
 Aline Gurgel (REPUBLICANOS)
 Marcivânia Flexa (PCdoB)
 Luiz Carlos Gomes (PSDB)
 André Abdon (PP)
 Leda Sadala (AVANTE)

Amazonas
 José Ricardo Wendling (PT)
 Delegado Pablo (PSL)
 Átila Lins (PP)
 Silas Câmara (REPUBLICANOS)
 Capitão Alberto Neto (REPUBLICANOS)
 Marcelo Ramos (PR)
 Sidney Leite (PSD)
 Bosco Saraiva (SOLIDARIEDADE)

Bahia
 Sargento Isidório (AVANTE)
 Otto Alencar Filho (PSD)
 José Carlos Bacelar (PODE)
 Dayane Pimentel (PSL)
 Jorge Solla (PT)
 Afonso Florence (PT)
 Zé Neto (PT)
 Antonio Brito (PSD)
 Alice Portugal (PCdoB)
 Luiz Caetano (PT)
 Waldenor Pereira (PT)
 Valmir Assunção (PT)
 Ronaldo Carletto (PP)
 Josias Gomes (PT)
 Marcelo Nilo (PSB)
 Daniel Almeida (PCdoB)
 Cacá Leão (PP)
 Sérgio Brito (PSD)
 Lídice da Mata (PSB)
 Elmar Nascimento (DEM)
 Adolfo Viana (PSDB)
 Mário Negromonte Júnior (PP)
 Nelson Pelegrino (PT)
 José Nunes (PSD)
 Cláudio Cajado (PP)
 Márcio Marinho (REPUBLICANOS)
 Félix Mendonça (PDT)
 Arthur Maia (DEM)
 João Carlos Bacelar (PR)
 João Roma (REPUBLICANOS)
 Paulo Azi (DEM)
 José Rocha Alves (PR)
 Leur Lomanto Júnior (DEM)
 Uldurico Júnior (PCdoB)
 Alex Santana (DEM)
 Igor Kannário (PODE)
 Abílio Santana (PODE)
 Tito Cordeiro (AVANTE)
 Raimundo Costa (PATRI)

Ceará
 Capitão Wagner (PROS)
 Célio Studart (PV)
 Luizianne Lins (PT)
 José Guimarães (PT)
 Mauro Benevides Filho (PDT)
 Idilvan Alencar (PDT)
 AJ Albuquerque (PP)
 Robério Monteiro (PDT)
 Moses Rodrigues (MDB)
 Pedro Bezerra (PTB)
 Genecias Noronha (SOLIDARIEDADE)
 Domingos Neto (PSD)
 Denis Bezerra (PSB)
 André Figueiredo (PDT)
 Roberto Pessoa (PSDB)
 Leônidas Cristino (PDT)
 Heitor Freire (PSL)
 Eduardo Bismarck (PDT)
 José Aírton (PT)
 Júnior Mano (PATRI)
 Jaziel Pereira (PR)
 Vaidon Oliveira (PROS)

Espírito Santo
 Amaro Neto (REPUBLICANOS)
 Felipe Rigoni (PSB)
 Josias da Vitória (CIDADANIA)
 Helder Salomão (PT)
 Sérgio Vidigal (PDT)
 Soraya Manato (PSL)
 Norma Ayub (DEM)
 Paulo Foletto (PSB)
 Lauriete Malta (PR)
 Evair de Melo (PP)

Federal District
 Flávia Arruda (PR)
 Érika Kokay (PT)
 Bia Kicis (PATRI)
 Julio César Ribeiro (REPUBLICANOS)
 Israel Matos Batista (PV)
 Luis Miranda (DEM)
 Paula Belmonte (CIDADANIA)
 Celina Leão (PP)

Goiás
 Delegado Waldir (PSL)
 Flávia Morais (PDT)
 Zacarias Calil (DEM)
 Francisco Júnior (PSD)
 João Campos (REPUBLICANOS)
 Glauskston Batista Rios (PSC)
 Zé Mário (DEM)
 Magda Mofatto (PR)
 Alcides Rigeiro Filho (PP)
 Rubens Otoni (PT)
 Lucas Vergílio (SOLIDARIEDADE)
 Adriano Avelar (PP)
 Elias Vaz (PSB)
 Célio Silveira (PSDB)
 Alcides Rodrigues (PATRI)
 José Nelto (PODE)
 Major Vitor Hugo (PSL)

Maranhão
 Josimar Cunha Rodrigues (PR)
 Eduardo Braide (PMN)
 Márcio Jerry (PCdoB)
 Júnior Lourenço (PR)
 Rubens Júnior (PCdoB)
 Pedro Lucas Fernandes (PTB)
 Edilázio Júnior (PSD)
 André Fufuca (PP)
 Aluísio Mendes (PODE)
 Cléber Verde (REPUBLICANOS)
 Ubirajara do Pindaré (PSB)
 Juscelino Filho (DEM)
 Júnior Marreca Filho (PATRI)
 Hildo Rocha (MDB)
 Zé Carlos (PT)
 Gil Cutrim (PDT)
 João Marcelo (MDB)
 Gildenemir de Sousa Lima (PMN)

Mato Grosso
 Nelson Ned Previdente (PSL)
 José Medeiros (PODE)
 Emanuel Pinheiro (PTB)
 Neri Geller (PP)
 Carlos Bezerra (MDB)
 Leonardo Ribeiro Albuquerque (SOLIDARIEDADE)
 Rosa Neide (PT)
 Juarez Costa (MDB)

Mato Grosso do Sul
 Rose Modesto (PSDB)
 Fábio Trad (PSD)
 Beto Pereira (PSDB)
 Tereza Cristina (DEM),until 1 January 2019
 Geraldo Resende (PSDB), from 1 February 2019
 Loester Gomes de Souza (PSL)
 Vander Loubet (PT)
 Luiz Ovando (PSL)
 Dagoberto Nogueira (PDT)

Minas Gerais
 Marcelo Álvaro Antônio (PSL),until 1 January 2019
 Eneias Reis (PSL),from 1 February 2019
 André Janones (AVANTE)
 Paulo Guedes (PT)
 Áurea Carolina (PSOL)
 Gilberto Abramo (REPUBLICANOS)
 Cabo Junio Amaral (PSL)
 Eros Biondini (PROS)
 Reginaldo Lopes (PT)
 Weliton Prado (PROS)
 Rogério Correia (PT)
 João Carlos Siqueira (PT)
 Misael Varella (PSD)
 Rodrigo de Castro (PSDB)
 Hercílio Coelho Diniz (MDB)
 Stefano Aguiar (PSD)
 Patrus Ananias (PT)
 Zé Silva (SOLIDARIEDADE)
 Aécio Neves (PSDB)
 Lincoln Portela (PR)
 Eduardo Barbosa (PSDB)
 Diego Andrade (PSD)
 Emidio Madeira (PSB)
 Marcelo Aro (PODE)
 Lafayette Andrada (REPUBLICANOS)
 Antônio Pinheiro Neto (PP)
 Sub-Tenente Gonzaga (PDT)
 Margarida Salomão (PT)
 Odair Cunha (PT)
 Mário Heringer (PDT)
 Bilac Pinto (DEM)
 Fred Costa (PATRI)
 Domingos Savio (PSDB)
 Paulo Abi-Ackel (PSDB)
 Dimas Fabiano (PP)
 Tiago Mitraud (NOVO)
 Frederico de Castro Escaleira (PATRI)
 Euclydes Pettersen (PSC)
 Fábio Ramalho (MDB)
 Igor Timo (PODE)
 Júlio Delgado (PSB)
 Bruce Martins (PODE)
 Delegado Marcelo Freitas (PSL)
 Franco Cartafina (PODE)
 Charlles Evangelistas (PSL)
 Léo Motta (PSL)
 Luis Tibé (AVANTE)
 Alê Silva (PSL)
 Greyce Elias (AVANTE)
 Zé Vitor (PMN)

Pará
 Edmilson Rodrigues (PSOL)
 Cristiano Vale (PR)
 Elcione Barbalho (MDB)
 Vavá Martins (REPUBLICANOS)
 José Priante (MDB)
 Nilson Pinto (PSDB)
 Júnior Ferrari (PSD)
 Celso Sabino (PSDB)
 Éder Mauro (PSD)
 Beto Faro (PT)
 Olival Marques (DEM)
 Cássio Andrade (PSB)
 Airton Faleiro (PT)
 Hélio Leite (DEM)
 Paulo Bengtson (PTB)
 Joaquim Passarinho (PSD)
 Eduardo Costa (PTB)

Paraíba
 Gervásio Maia (PSB)
 Aguinaldo Ribeiro (PP)
 Wellington Roberto (PR)
 Damião Feliciano (PDT)
 Hugo Motta (REPUBLICANOS)
 Antonio Ribeiro (PT)
 Wilson Santiago (PTB)
 Pedro Cunha Lima (PSDB)
 Efraim Filho (DEM)
 Julian Lemos (PSL)
 Edna Henrique (PSDB)
 Ruy Carneiro (PSDB)

Paraná
 Sargento Fahur (PSD)
 Felipe Francischini (PSL)
 Gleisi Hoffmann (PT)
 Luiz Goularte Alves (REPUBLICANOS)
 Sandro Alex (PSD)
 Leandre Dal Ponte (PV)
 Gustavo Fruet (PDT)
 Fernando Giacobo (PR)
 Hermes Parcianello (MDB)
 Christiane Yared (PR)
 Diego Garcia (PODE)
 Luciano Ducci (PSB)
 Aliel Machado (PSB)
 Sérgio Souza (MDB)
 Ney Leprevost (PSD)
 Pedro Lupion (DEM)
 Luisa Canziani (PTB)
 Emerson Petriv (PROS)
 Ricardo Barros (PP)
 Zeca Dirceu (PT)
 Rubens Bueno (CIDADANIA)
 José Carlos Schiavinato (PP)
 Filipe Barros (PSL)
 Luiz Nishimori (PR)
 Toninho Wandscheer (PROS)
 Nelsi Coguetto (PSD)
 Enio Verri (PT)
 Aroldo Martins (REPUBLICANOS)
 Aline Sleutjes (PSL)

Pernambuco
 João Henrique Campos (PSB)
 Marília Arraes (PT)
 André Ferreira (PSC)
 Sebastião Oliveira (PR)
 Eurico da Silva (PATRI)
 André de Paula (PSD)
 Luciano Bivar (PSL)
 Felipe Carreras (PSB)
 Eduardo da Fonte (PP)
 Sílvio Costa Filho (REPUBLICANOS)
 Daniel Coelho (CIDADANIA)
 Fernando Coelho Filho (MDB)
 Danilo Cabral (PSB)
 Raul Henry (MDB)
 Wolney Queiroz (PDT)
 Fernano Monteiro (PP)
 Gonzaga Patriota (PSB)
 Túlio Gadêlha (PDT)
 Ricardo Teobaldo (PODE)
 Carlos Veras (PT)
 Ossesio Silva (REPUBLICANOS)
 Renildo Calheiros (PCdoB)
 Tadeu Alencar (PSB)
 Fernando Rodolfo (PODE)

Piauí
 Rejane Dias (PT)
 Capitão Fábio Abreu (PR)
 Assis Carvalho (PT)
 Flávio Nogueira (PDT)
 Júlio Cesar Lima (PSD)
 Iracema Portela (PP)
 Margarete Coelho (PP)
 Marcos Aurélio Sampaio (MDB)
 Marina Batista Dias (PTC)
 Átila Lira (PSB)

Rio de Janeiro
 Hélio Bolsonaro (PSL)
 Marcelo Freixo (PSB)
 Alessandro Molon (PSB)
 Carlos Jordy (PSL)
 Flordelis (PSD)
 Daniela de Souza Carneiro (MDB)
 Otoni de Paula Júnior (PSC)
 Luiz Lima (PSL)
 Talíria Petrone (PSOL)
 Delegado Antônio Furtado (PSL)
 Luiz Teixeira Júnior (PP)
 Sóstenes Cavalcante (DEM)
 Rodrigo Maia (I)
 Jandira Feghali (PCdoB)
 Áureo Moreira Ribeiro (SOLIDARIEDADE)
 Wagner Montes (REPUBLICANOS),until 26 January 2019
 Jorge Braz (REPUBLICANOS),from 1 February 2019
 Rosângela Gomes (REPUBLICANOS)
 Hugo Leal (PSD)
 Sargento Gurgel (PSL)
 Vinícius Farah (MDB)
 Major Fabiana (PSL)
 Pedro Paulo (MDB)
 Altineu Côrtes (PR)
 Gutemberg Reis (MDB)
 Paulo Ganime (NOVO)
 Marcelo Calero (CIDADANIA)
 Luiz Antônio Corrêa (DC)
 Soraya Santos (PR)
 Christino Áureo (PP)
 Felício Laterça (PSL)
 Márcio Labre (PSL)
 Rogério Teixeira Júnior (DEM)
 Benedita da Silva (PT)
 Lourival Gomes (PSL)
 Glauber Braga (PSOL)
 Wladimir Garotinho (PATRI)
 Chris Tonietto (PSL)
 Alexandre Serfiotis (PSD)
 Clarissa Garotinho (PROS)
 Joziel Ferreira (PSL)
 Daniel Silveira (PSL)
 Gelson Azevedo (PODE)
 Chico d'Ângelo (PDT)
 Chiquinho Brazão (AVANTE)
 Paulo Ramos (PDT)
 David Miranda (PSOL)

Rio Grande do Norte
 Benes Leocádio (PTC)
 Natália Bonavides (PT)
 João Maia (PR)
 Rafael Motta(PSB)
 General Girão (PSL)
 Walter Alves (MDB)
 Beto Rosado (PP)
 Fábio Faria (PSD)

Rio Grande do Sul
 Marcel van Hattem (NOVO)
 Onyx Lorenzoni (DEM),until 1 January 2019
 Marcelo Brum (PSL),from 1 February 2019
 Giovani Cherini (PR)
 Paulo Pimenta (PT)
 Dionilso Marcon (PT)
 Marlon Santos (PDT)
 Lucas Redecker (PSDB)
 Fernanda Melchionna (PSOL)
 Heitor Schuch (PSB)
 Henrique Fontana (PT)
 Carlos Gomes (REPUBLICANOS)
 Bohn Gass (PT)
 Danrlei Hinterholz (PSD)
 Covatti Filho (PP)
 Márcio Biolchi (MDB)
 Alceu Moreira (MDB)
 Afonso Hamm (PP)
 Maria do Rosário (PT)
 Pedro Westphalen (PP)
 Giovani Feltes (MDB)
 Bibo Nunes (PSL)
 Jerônimo Goergen (PP)
 Ubiratan Sanderson (PSL)
 Osmar Terra (MDB),until 1 January 2019
 Darcísio Perondi (MDB),from 1 February 2019
 Maurício Dziedricki (PTB)
 Pompeo de Mattos (PDT)
 Daniel Trzeciak (PSDB)
 Marcelo Moraes (PTB)
 Afonso Motta (PDT)
 Liziane Bayer (PSB)
 Nereu Crispim (PSL)

Rondônia
 Léo Moraes (PODE)
 Expedito Netto (PSD)
 Mariana Carvalho (PSDB)
 Lúcio Mosquini (MDB)
 Jaqueline Cassol (PP)
 Sílvia Cristina Chagas (PDT)
 Mauro Nazif (PSB)
 Corone Chrisóstomo (PSL)

Roraima
 Haroldo Cathedral (PSD)
 Johnathan de Jesus (REPUBLICANOS)
 Hiran Gonçalves (PP)
 Antonio Carlos Nicoletti (PSL)
 Shéridan Oliveira (PSDB)
 Édio Lopes (PR)
 Otaci Barroso (SOLIDARIEDADE)
 Joênia Wapichana (REDE)

Santa Catarina
 Hélio Costa (REPUBLICANOS)
 Daniel Freitas (PSL)
 Pedro Uczai (PT)
 Caroline de Toni (PSL)
 Geovânia de Sá (PSDB)
 Carlos Chiodini (MDB)
 Fabio Schiochet (PSL)
 Ângela Amin (PP)
 Carmen Zanotto (CIDADANIA)
 Celso Maldaner (MDB)
 Rogério Peninha (MDB)
 Darci de Matos (PSD)
 Ricardo Guidi (PSD)
 Coronel Armando (PSL)
 Rodrigo Coelho (REPUBLICANOS)
 Gilson Marques (NOVO)

São Paulo
 Eduardo Bolsonaro (PSL)
 Joice Hasselmann (PSL)
 Celso Russomanno (REPUBLICANOS)
 Kim Kataguiri (DEM)
 Tiririca (PR)
 Tabata Amaral (PDT)
 Policial Katia Sastre (PR)
 Sâmia Bomfim (PSOL)
 Capitão Augusto (PR)
 Marco Feliciano (PODE)
 Baleia Rossi (MDB)
 Vinicius Poit (NOVO)
 Luiza Erundina (PSOL)
 Renata Abreu (PODE)
 Rui Falcão (PT)
 Alexandre Frota (PSL)
 Ivan Valente (PSOL)
 Marcos Pereira (REPUBLICANOS)
 Carlos Zarattini (PT)
 Marco Bertaiolli (PSD)
 Márcio Alvino (PR)
 Guilherme Mussi (PP)
 Arnaldo Jardim (CIDADANIA)
 Alex Manente (CIDADANIA)
 Bruna Furlan (PSDB)
 Carlos Sampaio (PSDB)
 Nilto Tatto (PT)
 Ricardo Izar (PP)
 Vitor Lippi (PSDB)
 Tenente Derrite (PP)
 Antonio Correia Freire (PSD)
 Fausto Pinato (PP)
 Luiz Philippe of Orléans-Braganza (PSL)
 Alexandre Leite (DEM)
 Paulo Freire Costa (PR)
 Enrico Misasi (PV)
 Rosana Valle (PSB)
 Samuel Moreira (PSDB)
 Vanderlei Macris (PSDB)
 Rodrigo Agostinho (PSB)
 Jefferson Campos (PSB)
 David Soares (DEM)
 Coronel Tadeu (PSL)
 Vinicius Carvalho (REPUBLICANOS)
 Eduardo Cury (PSDB)
 Miguel Lombardi (PR)
 Eli Corrêa Filho (DEM)
 Gilberto Nascimento (PSC)
 Geninho Zuliani (DEM)
 Alexandre Padilha (PT)
 Luiz Flávio Gomes (PSB)
 Roberto Alves (REPUBLICANOS)
 Junior Bozzella (PSL)
 Paulo Teixeira (PT)
 Milton Vieira (REPUBLICANOS)
 Carla Zambelli (PSL)
 Paulo Pereira da Silva (SOLIDARIEDADE)
 Luiz Carlos Motta (PR)
 General Peternelli (PSL)
 Maria Rosas (REPUBLICANOS)
 Vicente Paulo da Silva (PT)
 Abou Anni (PSL)
 Alencar Santana (PT)
 Orlando Silva (PCdoB)
 Adriana Ventura (NOVO)
 Roberto de Lucena (PODE)
 Herculano Passos (MDB)
 Alexis Fonteyne (NOVO)
 Guiga Peixoto (PSL)

Sergipe
 Fábio Mitidieri (PSD)
 Laércio Oliveira (PP)
 Fábio Reis (MDB)
 Gustinho Ribeiro (SOLIDARIEDADE)
 João Daniel (PT)
 Bosco Costa (PR)
 Valdevan Noventa (PSC)
 Fábio Henrique Santana (PDT)

Tocantins
 Tiago Dimas (SOLIDARIEDADE)
 Osires Damaso (PSC)
 Dulce Miranda (MDB)
 Dorinha Rezende (DEM)
 Carlos Henrique Gaguim (DEM)
 Eli Borges (SOLIDARIEDADE)
 Vicentinho Júnior (PR)
 Célio Moura (PT)

Changes in membership

Chamber of Deputies

Federal Senate

Defections and suspensions

Federal Senate

Chamber of Deputies

By-elections
 2020 Mato Grosso senatorial special election

Committees

Federal Senate

Chamber of Deputies

Parliamentary Inquiry Committees

Notes

References

Legislative branch of Brazil
Brazil